Southwick and Widley is a civil parish in the English county of Hampshire forming part of the area administered as the City of Winchester. It comprises the village of Southwick and parts of the Havant suburb of Widley.

History 
The parish was formed on 1 April 1932 from the parishes of Farlington, Southwick, Waterloo and Widley.

References

Civil parishes in Winchester